Gary Blackwood may refer to:

Gary Blackwood (author) (born 1945), US author
Gary Blackwood (politician) (born 1951), Australian politician